Alexander Scott Bullitt (1761 – April 13, 1816) was an American pioneer, planter, slaveowner, and politician from Virginia who became an early settler in Kentucky and a leader during the early days of Kentucky statehood.

Early and family life
Bullitt's family had come to America as refugee French Huguenots in 1685. Arriving first in Maryland, part of the family settled in Prince William County, Virginia. Alexander was born there in 1761, the son of colonial planter and politician Cuthbert Bullitt and Helen (Scott) Bullitt. His father owned plantations and slaves, as well as was a leading lawyer in local and colonial affairs. Alexander's early schooling was directed at making him a lawyer. But his uncle Thomas Bullitt was a pioneer and military leader, involved with western exploration.

Career
At first, Bullitt emulated his father's career, serving part-time in the Virginia House of Delegates representing Prince William County.

Settling in Kentucky 
Bullitt settled first in an area that became Shelby County but soon found the area too isolated, as well as subject to raids from Native Americans.

Thus he moved toward the Ohio River. His late uncle Thomas Bullitt, after leading the Virginia militia westward in Dunmore's War, had returned to the  Falls of the Ohio and surveyed a town site in 1773. In 1800 the Virginia legislature incorporated the new town and named it Louisville. Alexander bought 1000 acres (4 km2) about 9 miles (14 km) south of Louisville and began clearing another farm. He named the plantation Oxmoor, after the fictional farm in Tristram Shandy. 

In August 1785, his neighbor, Colonel William Christian, who had represented Fincastle County, Virginia during the American Revolutionary War and was now developing a neighboring Jefferson County property, brought his wife and family from Virginia. Two months later Alexander married their young daughter Priscilla, and thus also improved his political connections (her uncle was Patrick Henry). They built Oxmoor Farm, starting the main house in 1787, and growing tobacco, hemp, and corn. In 1789, Bullitt owned twenty-three enslaved people at Oxmoor. By 1795, that number had grown to seventy.

Political career
In 1784 Bullitt made his first steps in Kentucky politics. He became an officer in the local militia, and met with others at Danville in a convention that first proposed a separation from Virginia. After  Colonel Christian died in a skirmish with Indians in 1786, Bullitt continued with the local militia and was promoted to the rank of major. He also became a trustee of the town of Louisville. 

In 1792 when the idea of Kentucky statehood was accepted, Bullitt became a delegate to the Convention (again in Danville) and sat the committee that drafted the first state Constitution. With the new constitution in place, in June he was one of twelve men elected to the State Senate. He was elected its speaker, and served there until 1800.

When a second state constitution was sought, in 1799, Bullitt presided at the convention that wrote it. This new constitution created the office of Lieutenant Governor and he was elected to that office in 1800 serving under Governor James Garrard.

In 1804 or 1808  Bullitt returned to private life and full-time farming at Oxmoor.

Personal life

He married Priscilla Christian (1785-1806), daughter of William Christian and his wife Annie Henry Christian (sister of Patrick Henry). Four of their children reached adulthood: William Christian, Anne, Helen Scott, Cuthbert. 

After his first wife died, Bullitt remarried, to widow Mary Churchill Prather. They had two children, Thomas James and Mary (Polly).

Death and legacy

Bullitt died at Oxmoor in 1816 and is buried in the family graveyard. Bullitt County, Kentucky was named in his honor. Henry Clay's last court case,  concerned the will of Mary (Polly) Bullitt that her two brothers challenged.

References

Further reading

1761 births
1816 deaths
American planters
Lieutenant Governors of Kentucky
Kentucky state senators
Alexander
People from Prince William County, Virginia
Politicians from Louisville, Kentucky
Burials in Kentucky
18th-century American politicians
19th-century American politicians